Adanaca Brown (born 23 October 1993) is a hurdler from the Bahamas. She competed in the 100 metres hurdles event at the 2015 World Championships in Beijing without qualifying for the semifinals.

Her personal best in the 100 metres hurdles is 13.00 seconds (-0.1 m/s) set in Nassau in 2015. With that result she is the co-holder of the national record.

Competition record

See also
 Bahamas at the 2015 World Championships in Athletics

References

External links
 http://www.all-athletics.com/node/452078 
 
 In 100m Hurdles, Adanaca Brown Qualifies For IAAF Worlds

Living people
1993 births
Place of birth missing (living people)
Bahamian female hurdlers
World Athletics Championships athletes for the Bahamas
Pan American Games competitors for the Bahamas
Athletes (track and field) at the 2015 Pan American Games
Athletes (track and field) at the 2016 Summer Olympics
Olympic athletes of the Bahamas